Firat Tuncer (born 25 February 1995) is a professional footballer who plays as a centre-back for 1. FC Kaan-Marienborn in the Regionalliga West.

Club career
Tuncer was born in Cologne, and joined local side 1. FC Köln as a youth player. In 2014, he was integrated in to the club's second team, who play in the Regionalliga West. After over 60 appearances, he was released in July 2016. He signed for Austrian side Lustenau in January 2017.

On 12 June 2019, SC Fortuna Köln announced that they had signed Tuncer on a 1-year contract.

International career
Tuncer was called up to the Turkey under-18 side in 2013 to play against Belarus.

Career statistics

Club

Notes

References

1995 births
Living people
Turkish footballers
Citizens of Turkey through descent
German people of Turkish descent
Association football central defenders
1. FC Köln II players
SC Austria Lustenau players
SC Fortuna Köln players
ZFC Meuselwitz players
1. FC Kaan-Marienborn players
Regionalliga players
2. Liga (Austria) players
Footballers from Cologne
Turkish expatriate footballers
Expatriate footballers in Austria
Turkish expatriate sportspeople in Austria